Saint Maurice is an unincorporated community in Fugit Township, Decatur County, Indiana, United States.

History
Saint Maurice was laid out in 1859. It was originally settled chiefly by Catholics, and named for Saint Maurice.

Geography

References

Unincorporated communities in Decatur County, Indiana
Unincorporated communities in Indiana